In U.S. criminal law, a proffer letter, proffer agreement, proffer, or "Queen for a Day" letter is a written agreement between a prosecutor and a defendant or prospective witness that allows the defendant or witness to give the prosecutor information about an alleged crime, while limiting the prosecutor's ability to use that information against him or her.

The term Queen for a Day comes from the American radio and television show of the same name.

Notes

United States criminal law
Agreements